Stanley Roy Crossett (April 26, 1903 – July 26, 1992) was a Canadian professional ice hockey defenceman who played one season in the National Hockey League for the Philadelphia Quakers in 1930–31. He played 21 games and did not score a point, though registered 10 penalty minutes.

Career statistics

Regular season and playoffs

References

External links
 
 

1903 births
1992 deaths
Canadian ice hockey defencemen
Ice hockey people from Ontario
Philadelphia Quakers (NHL) players
Sportspeople from Tillsonburg